Angra may refer to:

Places
 Bay of Angra (Baía de Angra), within Angra do Heroísmo on the Portuguese island of Terceira in the archipelago of the Azores
 Angra do Heroísmo, a municipality in the Azores, Portugal
 Angra dos Reis, a municipality in the state of Rio de Janeiro, Brazil
 Angra Nuclear Power Plant in Brazil
 Angra Pequena or Lüderitz Bay in Namibia, Africa
 Angra Toldo

Other
 Angra (band), a Brazilian heavy metal band
 Angra (insect), a genus of burrowing bugs in the subfamily Sehirinae
 Angra labeo, species of fish in the family Cyprinidae
 , a number of ships with this name
 Angra Mainyu, the destructive spirit (or evil) in the Zoroastrian faith